The Christmas Dragon is a 2014 family film directed by John Lyde.

Summary
Ayden, an orphan in Medieval Europe who lost her parents from a dragon, receives a magic crystal from a dying elf to bring back Christmas from becoming a fading memory. She and the other orphans alongside wayward adult Airk must go to the North to meet Father Christmas.

Reception
Common Sense Media gave it one star.

Jake Stormoen, who plays Airk, won the Best Supporting Actor category at the Utah Film Awards the next year.

Appearance on MST3K
It was featured as an episode on Season 13 of the cult science fiction series Mystery Science Theater 3000.

References

External links
The Christmas Dragon on IMDb
Official website
MST3K treatment of said film on IMDb

2014 films
Santa Claus in film
2014 independent films
Films about orphans
Films about dragons
American independent films